Pompano Beach is a Tri-Rail commuter rail station in Pompano Beach, Florida, United States. With 109,000 passengers in the first six months of 2011, it is the 10th-busiest Tri-Rail station. In 2015, the station had about 800 weekday riders.

The Pompano Beach station is located at Northwest Eighth Avenue and 35th Street, just southeast of the intersection of West Sample Road (SR 834) and Military Trail (SR 809). The station, officially opened to service January 9, 1989, offers parking. Pompano Beach is the last station not to be renovated to include better platform roofs, elevators and a pedestrian bridge over the tracks like most stations underwent during double tracking of the line, but is now being rebuilt from 2015 to 2016.

Reconstruction

In 2011, Tri-Rail received a $5.7 million grant to renovate Pompano Beach as an environmentally sustainable station, collecting more than 100% of its energy demand through solar power, with the excess to be put on the grid. Construction was to have started in spring 2012 and finished by May 2013 but the project fell through. In December 2014 Tri-Rail's governing board awarded a $40 million contract to Gulf Building to build a new headquarters, parking garage and station on the site of the Pompano Beach stop and on April 17, 2015 the South Florida Sun-Sentinel reported that groundbreaking was to take place later in the month. The upgrades are scheduled for completion in summer 2016  The renovation and construction of the 450-space garage caused a parking crunch at the station where only 39 spots remained.

Station layout
The station has two side platforms. A surface parking lot is located west of the southbound platform, while a parking garage and the SFRTA headquarters are east of the northbound platform.

References

External links
 
 South Florida Regional Transportation Authority - Pompano Beach station
 Station from 33rd Street from Google Maps Street View

Tri-Rail stations in Broward County, Florida
Railway stations in the United States opened in 1989
Buildings and structures in Pompano Beach, Florida
1989 establishments in Florida